Florent Troillet (born 7 June 1981) is a Swiss ski mountaineer.

Troillet was born in Lourtier. He competed first in 1995. He has been member of the national team since 1996 and member of the Dynafit team since 2003. In 2007, in a team with Simon Anthamatten (leader), Ernest Farquet and Marcel Marti, he climbed the Matterhorn via the Swiss side in a record time of 3 hours 45 minutes. The record was beaten by Andreas Steindl in 2011.

His sister Marie is also a competition ski mountaineer.

Selected results 
 2004:
 1st, Trophée des Gastlosen, together with Pierre-Marie Taramarcaz
 1st, World Championship ("cadetts" and "juniors")
 2nd, World Championship ("juniors")
 10th, World Championship team race ("seniors" ranking; together with Pierre-Marie Taramarcaz)
 2005:
 6th, World Cup team (together with Alexander Hug)
 10th, World Cup race, Salt Lake City
 2006:
 1st, Swiss Championship single race
 3rd, Trophée des Gastlosen, together with Yannick Ecoeur
 3rd, World Championship relay race (together with Alexander Hug, Alain Rey and Rico Elmer)
 3rd, European Cup team (together with Rico Elmer), Albosaggia
 2007:
 1st, Dachstein Xtreme race
 3rd, World Cup single
 5th, European Championship team race (together with Alexander Hug)
 5th, European Championship single
 7th, European Championship combination ranking
 2008:
 2nd, World Championship single race
 2nd, World Championship relay race (together with Pierre Bruchez, Martin Anthamatten and Didier Moret)
 2nd, World Cup race, Val d'Aran
 4th, World Championship long distance race
 8th, World Championship vertical race
 9th, World Championship combination ranking
 1st, Trophée des Gastlosen, together with Alexander Hug
 2009:
 1st, Valtellina Orobie World Cup race
 3rd, European Championship relay race (together with Marcel Marti, Pierre Bruchez and Yannick Ecoeur)
 8th, European Championship single race
 2010:
 1st, World Championship single race
 2nd, World Championship team race (together with Martin Anthamatten)
 2nd, World Championship relay race (together with Martin Anthamatten, Yannick Ecoeur and Pierre Bruchez)
 4th, World Championship single race
 4th, World Championship combination ranking
 8th, World Championship vertical race
 3rd, Trophée des Gastlosen (ISMF World Cup), together with Martin Anthamatten
 2012:
 1st, Zermatt-Rothorn run
 2nd, Sellaronda Skimarathon (together with Pietro Lanfranchi)
 2nd, Patrouille de la Maya, together with Martin Anthamatten and Yannick Ecoeur

Trofeo Mezzalama 

 2003: 6th, together with Christian Pittex and Didier Moret
 2005: 2nd, together with Alexander Hug and Christian Pittex
 2007: 1st, together with Guido Giacomelli and Jean Pellissier

Pierra Menta 

 2006: 3rd, together with Rico Elmer
 2008: 1st, together with Kílian Jornet Burgada
 2009: 5th, together with Marcel Marti
 2010: 1st, together with Kílian Jornet Burgada

Patrouille des Glaciers 

 2004: 4th, together with Christian Pittex and Alexander Hug
 2006: 3rd (and 1st in international military teams ranking), together with Cpl Rico Elmer and Pvt E-2 Yannick Ecoeur
 2008: 1st, together with Didier Moret and Alexander Hug
 2010: 1st, together with Martin Anthamatten and Yannick Ecoeur

External links 
 Florent Troillet at Skimountaineering.org

References 

1981 births
Living people
Swiss male ski mountaineers
World ski mountaineering champions
Swiss military patrol (sport) runners
People from Bagnes
Sportspeople from Valais